João Eduardo Pinto de Loureiro (Porto, Portugal, 9 October 1963) was the president of the board (chairman) of the Portuguese football club Boavista FC, from the 2nd January 2013 until the 28th December 2018. Now he is the President of the General Council of the club. 

He had previously held the office between 1997 and 2007, when he was the most successful president of the board of Boavista's history: he was the youngest football president to be champion ever in Portugal (in the 2000–2001 season), the year in which he was considered the best chairman of Portugal by the newspaper Record.  He also won the Honour Panther prize and the Gold Panther prize. 
During his mandates as President (Chairman) of Boavista FC, the club won all the Portuguese competitions of professional football at the time (Premier League of Portugal, Cup of Portugal and Supercup of Portugal), as well as all the national competitions u-19 and women’s football, and was twice Vice-Champion of Portugal.
Internationally, the club participated three times in the UEFA Champions League and went to the semi-finals of the UEFA Cup. Also, it was during his mandate that the modern and sophisticated stadium Estádio do Bessa Século XXI was built; it has 30,000 seats and was the location of several matches for the 2004 UEFA European Championship.

In January 2013, he was again elected President (Chairman) of Boavista FC, after having been asked to be back by thousands of members of the club. After being elected, Boavista achieved on 29 June 2013 the right to be back to the Portuguese Premier League in 2014. He demanded a compensation from the Portuguese Football Federation for all damages of the decision to relegate the club to the second division caused. Also, he negotiated a Special Revitalization Procedure, which was achieved by an agreement with the creditors, that made the global debt amount of the club to be renegotiated and substantially reduced, on 4 September 2013, in what was seen as an historical moment for Boavista. The club has participated with success in the Portuguese premier league in the seasons 2014/2015 and 2015/2016. In the season 2016/2017 and 2017/2018 the objectives were once again achieved, and Boavista finished in the 9th and 8th place in the main Portuguese league. After having reorganized and restructured the club, at the end of his second mandate, he decided to not be recandidate for a new mandate as President of the Board, and was invited and elected to be the President of the General Council of Boavista for the mandate 2019/2021.

João Loureiro is a lawyer (Universidade Católica law degree, as well of degrees in English by the Pilgrims Language School, Folkestone, UK, and in French by Berlitz, Paris) business executive (in several areas including textile, plastic products and fish conserves industries, commerce and hospitality, including restaurants and night life) and international consultant for business.

He was also author, vocalist and leader of the very popular Portuguese dance-pop band BAN during the 1980s and early 1990s, with several hits, like 'Irreal Social', 'Mundo de Aventuras' and 'Dias Atlânticos', recently considered one of the most important ever in the Portuguese modern music. They released five awarded albums for EMI during that period (Documento; Surrealizar; Música Concreta; Mundo de Aventuras; Num Filme Sempre Pop), in which João Loureiro was also involved in a more global cultural movement in his town Porto, including the conception and promotion of several events. He also was the leading vocalist of Zero, that released one album, recorded and mixed in London, for Sony Music. In 2010 BAN released a new album, "Dansity", very well accepted by the specialized critics.

He was also the President of the Young Lawiers Association Assembly, as well as an Officer in the Portuguese Army.

In 1998, he was elected deputy for the Portuguese Parliament in the lists of the party PSD.

Nowadays he works in International Consultancy and premium Events.

João Loureiro is married since 1988 with his wife Maria do Rosário and has two sons (Valentim and Vasco) and two daughters (Maria and Sofia).

His father Valentim Loureiro, was a politician, mayor, businessman and also a former very successful chairman of Boavista FC, as well as of the portuguese League of Football.

References

Portuguese football chairmen and investors
21st-century Portuguese male singers
Living people
People from Porto
1963 births
20th-century Portuguese male singers